The point of no return is the moment after which adverse consequences would commit one to a course of action.

Point of no return may also refer to:

Film 
 Point of No Return, a 1990 Hong Kong film starring Jacky Cheung
 Point of No Return (1991 film) or Touch and Go, a Hong Kong film
 Point of No Return (1993 film), an American adaptation of the 1990 French thriller Nikita
 Point of No Return (1995 film), an Australian film
 Point of No Return, a 2000 Hong Kong film featuring Joe Ma
 Point of No Return, a 2018 film starring Steven Berkoff

Music 
 Point of No Return (ballet), a musical piece by Juan Maria Solare
 Point of No Return (band), a Brazilian band

Albums 
 Point of No Return (Frank Sinatra album), 1962
 Point of No Return (Keyshia Cole album), 2014
 Point of No Return (Shareefa album), 2006
 Point of No Return (Systems in Blue album) or the title song (see below),  2005
 Point of No Return (World Saxophone Quartet album) or the title song, 1977
 Point of No Return, an unreleased album by 3LW
 Point of No Return (Havok EP) or the title song, 2012
 Point of No Return (Mr. Envi' EP), 2013

Songs 
 "Point of No Return" (Centory song), 1994
 "Point of No Return" (Exposé song), 1985
 "Point of No Return" (Nu Shooz song), 1986
 "Point of No Return" (Systems in Blue song), 2005
 "Point of No Return", by Duran Duran from Astronaut
 "Point of No Return", by Electric Light Orchestra from Mr. Blue Sky
 "Point of No Return", by Gene McDaniels
 "The Point of No Return", by Immortal Technique from Revolutionary Vol. 2
 "Point of No Return", by Status Quo from Thirsty Work
 "The Point of No Return", from the musical The Phantom of the Opera

Television 
 Point of No Return (TV series), a Hong Kong drama series

Episodes
 "Point of No Return" (Babylon 5)
 "Point of No Return" (CSI: NY)
 "Point of No Return" (Stargate SG-1)
 "Point of No Return" (Supernatural)
 "Point of No Return" (That's So Raven)

Other 
 Point of No Return (play), a 1951 Broadway play by Paul Osborn, based on the novel by John P. Marquand
 Point of No Return (novel), by John P. Marquand, 1949
 Point of no return (computer games), a concept in computer games
 Point of no return, in air navigation, when an aircraft no longer has enough fuel to return to the airfield it departed from
 Point of No Return, a water slide at Noah's Ark Water Park, Wisconsin Dells, Wisconsin, U.S.

See also 
 Point of Know Return, a 1977 album by Kansas
 "Point of Know Return" (song), the title song